Wait for Me, Daddy is a photo taken by Claude P. Dettloff on October 1, 1940, of The British Columbia Regiment (Duke of Connaught's Own Rifles) marching down Eighth Street at the Columbia Street intersection, New Westminster, British Columbia.  While Dettloff was taking the photo, Warren "Whitey" Bernard ran away from his mother to his father, Private Jack Bernard.  The picture received extensive exposure and was used in war-bond drives.

Background
On Saturday August 26, 1939, Hitler was threatening Poland and demanding Danzig. At 4:15 13 seconds that morning the regimental adjutant in British Columbia, Canada received a call from the Canadian capital instructing him to call out the British Columbia Regiment. Soldiers fanned out in the city to guard vulnerable points. On September 10, 1939, the Parliament of Canada declared war against the German Reich, which had invaded Poland on the first of the month. While other units were sent to the United Kingdom, the British Columbia Regiment was left behind on the west coast. After months of drills and guard duty the regiment was ordered out and on October 1, 1940, marched to New Westminster to catch a waiting ship, the SS Princess Joan, to their secret destination.

The march and the photograph
Coming down Eighth Street in New Westminster, Canadian photographer Claude P. Dettloff of The Province newspaper positioned himself to photograph the whole column marching down the hill.  As he was getting ready to take the picture, he saw a young boy run out onto the road; Wait for Me, Daddy captures the image of the boy, five-year-old Warren "Whitey" Bernard, running out of his mother's grasp to his father.

The picture Dettloff captured was picked up all over the world, getting exposure in Life; it hung in every school in British Columbia during the war.

Aftermath
The secret destination turned out to be Nanaimo, only three hours away. Later, after years of training, the regiment converted from infantry to armour and was sent to France and the Netherlands; it returned home at war's end. When Jack Bernard returned home, Dettloff was on hand to photograph the family's reunion.  Jack and Bernice Bernard eventually divorced.

The City of New Westminster commissioned a bronze statue honouring the photo to be placed at the bottom of 8th Street, in Hyack Square. The city unveiled the statue on October 4, 2014. At the same event, the Royal Canadian Mint announced the issue of a series of three coins featuring a scene adapted from the image: it was released in denominations of $2 (alloy), $3 ( silver) and $10 ( silver). 
Canada Post also issued a stamp featuring the iconic image.

A re-enactment of the soldiers' march was planned for March 2015, to mark the 70th anniversary of the end of the Second World War.

Other stories
Detloff unwittingly captured a lesser known story in this photograph, though no less characteristic of wartime Canada. On the left-hand side of the photograph, the third woman behind "Whitey's" mother (wearing a dark long coat and staring directly toward the camera) is Agnes Confortin (née Power) who had accompanied her friend Phyllis Daem that day to see the young men of New Westminster off. Even with the limited resolution of the photo, Agnes' somber expression reflects her concern for her two brothers, Wilfred and Larry Power, who have already enlisted in the North Nova Scotia Highlanders. Larry returned to Canada in 1944 with severe posttraumatic stress disorder. Wilfred was killed in action in March 1945 near Arnhem as part of Canadian Forces preparation for the Liberation of Arnhem in April 1945.

References

External links 
Google Street View of photo's location
Sculpture unveiled

1940 in Canada
New Westminster
Black-and-white photographs
World War II photographs
Military history of Canada during World War II
1940 works
1940 in art
Photography in Canada
1940s photographs